The Village of No Return is a 2017 Taiwanese-Chinese action comedy film directed by Chen Yu-hsun, starring Shu Qi, Wang Qianyuan, Joseph Chang, Eric Tsang and Tony Yang. It was released on January 26, 2017 in Taiwan and on January 28, 2017 in China.

Plot
It is an unusual day for the remote and isolated Desire Village. A mysterious Taoist priest brings a magical equipment that can erase one's memory. Since then, all the villagers have forgotten their past, living "happily ever after", while the dangerous plot behind their back is just about to be.

Cast
Shu Qi as Autumn 
Wang Qianyuan as Fortune Tien
Joseph Chang as Master Wan 
Lin Mei-hsiu as Dark Cloud 
Eric Tsang as Rock Peeler 
Tony Yang as Dean Wang 
Ku Pao-ming as Chief 
Cheng Yu-chieh as Autumn's father 
Ying Wei-min as Villain 
Hsu Chieh-hui as Golden Lin 
Lawrence Ko as Purple Cloud 
Bamboo Chen as Red Cloud
Chang Shao-huai as Dr. Liu 
Jag Huang as Blue Cloud

Awards and nominations

References

External links

2017 films
2010s fantasy comedy films
Taiwanese action comedy films
Taiwanese fantasy films
2010s Mandarin-language films
Chinese fantasy films
Chinese action comedy films
2017 comedy films